The 1882–83 season was ninth season of competitive football by Rangers.

Overview
Rangers played a total matches during the 1882–83 season.

Results
All results are written with Rangers' score first.

Scottish Cup

Appearances

See also
 1882–83 in Scottish football
 1882–83 Scottish Cup

External links
1882–83 Rangers F.C.Results

Rangers F.C. seasons
Rangers